Xylanthemum is a genus of Asian plants in the daisy family.

 Species
 Xylanthemum fisherae (Aitch. & Hemsl.) Tzvelev  - Uzbekistan, Kyrgyzstan, Tajikistan, Afghanistan
 Xylanthemum gilletii (Podlech) K.Bremer & Humphries -  Iran
 Xylanthemum lingulatum (Boiss.) K.Bremer & Humphries -  Iran
 Xylanthemum macropodum (Hemsl. & Lace) K.Bremer & Humphries - Pakistan
 Xylanthemum paghmanense (Podlech) K.Bremer & Humphries - Afghanistan
 Xylanthemum pamiricum (O.Hoffm.) Tzvelev - Uzbekistan, Kyrgyzstan, Tajikistan, Afghanistan, Iran
 Xylanthemum polycladum (Rech.f.) Tzvelev 
 Xylanthemum rupestre (Popov ex Nevski) Tzvelev - Uzbekistan, Kyrgyzstan, Tajikistan, Afghanistan
 Xylanthemum tianschanicum (Krasch.) Muradyan - Tian Shan Mountains in Kashmir, Pakistan, Tajikistan, Kyrgyzstan

References

Anthemideae
Flora of temperate Asia
Asteraceae genera